Ankyrin repeat domain-containing protein 13C is a protein that in humans is encoded by the ANKRD13C gene.

Protein interactions 

ANKRD13C is predicted to interact with Transmembrane Protein Domain 255A (TMEM255A).

References

Further reading

External links